An amateur astronaut is an untrained person participating in a spaceflight. The term is widely used by SpaceX and others, and by widespread media, especially after the launch of Inspiration4, crewed by 4 untrained humans, on a 3-day flight around the Earth.

List of Amateur astronauts

 Christopher Sembroski (Inspiration4, 16 September 2021 – 18 September 2021)
 Sian Proctor (Inspiration4, 16 September 2021 – 18 September 2021)
 Jared Isaacman (Inspiration4, 16 September 2021 – 18 September 2021)
 Hayley Arceneaux (Inspiration4, 16 September 2021 – 18 September 2021)

References

External links
 Matt Watts. SpaceX launches world’s first ‘amateur astronaut’ crew to orbit Earth. Evening Standard, 16 September 2021
 Highlights From the SpaceX Inspiration4 Astronauts’ Splashdown. The New York Times, 18 September 2021

Spaceflight